The Morbi railway station belongs to Western Railway of Rajkot Division. It is located in Morbi district of Gujarat State.

History
The Maliya Miyana–Wankaner section was laid as a 2ft6inch (narrow gauge) roadside tram way in the year 1890 by Waghji Thakor of Morvi State Railway for the convenience of the people and for transportation of salt and cloth. Sir Lakhdhiraji Thakor, ruled from 1922 to 1948 after the death of Waghji Thakor. Sir Lakhdiraji acted as a ruler, manager, patron and policeman of the state with great authority. Sir Lakhdiraji, like other contemporary rulers of Saurashtra, built roads and a railway network (of seventy miles), connecting Wadhwan and Morbi and the two small ports of Navlakhi and Vavania, for exporting the state's production of salt and cloth. The Morbi railway station combines Indian and European architectural elements. All the lines were converted to metre gauge in 1924 to match the rail lines of other Princely States. Before railbuses took over on Wankaner–Morvi, there were two-coach trains hauled by YG or YP steam locos (these were the last steam-hauled trains on those routes). Conversion to broad gauge was completed in the year 2001.

Passenger amenities
More goods trains pass through this station than passenger trains. Only two express trains (weekly once each) arrive at this station. Six passenger trains terminate and start at this station. It has trains to Mumbai, Gandhidham and Wankaner.

References

Railway stations in Morbi district
Rajkot railway division